"Love in the First Degree" is a song by English girl group Bananarama from their fourth studio album, Wow! (1987). It was released on 28 September 1987 as the album's second single, except in the United States, where it was released in 1988 as the third single (following "I Can't Help It"). The track was co-written and produced by the Stock Aitken Waterman (SAW) trio.

The song is an uptempo pop tune similar to many hits produced by SAW during this time period. The surreal lyrics, composed by Siobhan Fahey and built upon by SAW and Bananarama members Sara Dallin and Keren Woodward, describes a dream in which they find themselves being tried in court for love. The musical structure could be compared to Pachelbel's Canon. 

Producer Pete Waterman variously claimed he came up with the idea for the song while in the bath, and after waking up one morning with the tune in his head. However Dallin has stated that he was not present during the song's composition. Waterman further claimed he had to threaten to pull SAW off the Wow! project in order to force the release of the track as a single, after it was dismissed by the band and label as too commercial.

"Love in the First Degree" peaked at number three on the UK Singles Chart, tying with "Robert De Niro's Waiting..." (1984) and "Help!" (1989) as Bananarama's highest-charting single in the United Kingdom to date. The single also charted within the top 10 in Australia, Belgium, Ireland, Norway and South Africa, and the top 20 in Finland, the Netherlands, New Zealand, Spain, Sweden and Switzerland. In the United States, the song reached number 48 on the Billboard Hot 100 and number 10 on Billboards Hot Dance Club Play chart.

As one of their final performances with Fahey, the group performed the song at the 1988 Brit Awards with a large entourage of male dancers dressed only in black bikini briefs. The song was nominated for British Single of the Year at that year's Brit Awards, but lost to Rick Astley's "Never Gonna Give You Up", also produced by Stock Aitken Waterman.

By the time "Love in the First Degree" was released in the United States, Fahey had already announced her departure from Bananarama.

The record sleeves for "Love in the First Degree" and "I Can't Help It", were switched with each other, for UK, and North American markets. 

The song was featured in episode 3 of the 2019 comedy-drama TV series Back to Life, sung in a recording by teenage girls.

In 2021, British magazine Classic Pop ranked it number 5 in their list of "Top 40 Stock Aitken Waterman songs".

Music video
The music video for "Love in the First Degree", directed by Andy Morahan, features the group performing the song in a jail cell, alternately dressed in black outfits and prison uniforms. Several male dancers perform around them. The imagery plays off of Elvis Presley's 1957 film Jailhouse Rock. Fahey was pregnant with her first child at the time of filming. Sections of the video featuring acrobatics used body doubles.

On Bananarama's The Greatest Hits Collection video compilation, the music video for "Love in the First Degree" is intercut with the live performance of the song at the 1988 Brit Awards, which was Fahey's last performance with the group.

Track listings
7-inch single
 "Love in the First Degree" (Album Version) – 3:33
 "Mr. Sleaze" – 4:45

UK 12-inch single
 "Love in the First Degree" (Jailer's Mix) – 6:03
 Available on the CD album "The Greatest Remixes Collection".
 "Love in the First Degree" (Escapee Instrumental) – 3:33
 "Mr. Sleaze" (Single Version) – 4:45

2nd 12-inch single / German 12-inch single
 "Love in the First Degree" (Eurobeat Style) – 7:15
 Available on the CD album "Greatest Hits Collection".
 "Mr. Sleaze" (Rare Groove Mix) – 6:00

US 12-inch single
 "Love in the First Degree" (Eurobeat Style) – 7:15
 "Love in the First Degree" (7" Mix) – 3:33
 "Love in the First Degree" (Jailer's Mix) – 6:03
 "Ecstacy" (Wild Style) – 5:35

Other versions
 "Love in the First Degree" (House Mix / House Mix Edit) – 5:45
 Available on the CD single "I Want You Back".
"Love in the First Degree" (Love In The House Mix / Full House Mix) – 8:35
 Available on the CD album Wow (2013 deluxe edition 2CD/DVD re-issue)
"Love in the First Degree" (House Dub) – 4:57
 Available on the CD Compilation Megarama - The Mixes 
"Love in the First Degree" (Jailer's Mix With Intro) – 6:15 
Available on the CD album Wow (2013 deluxe edition 2CD/DVD re-issue)

Personnel
Bananarama
 Sara Dallin – vocals
 Siobhan Fahey – vocals
 Keren Woodward – vocals

Charts

Weekly charts

Year-end charts

References

1987 singles
1987 songs
Bananarama songs
London Records singles
Music videos directed by Andy Morahan
Song recordings produced by Stock Aitken Waterman
Songs written by Keren Woodward
Songs written by Matt Aitken
Songs written by Mike Stock (musician)
Songs written by Pete Waterman
Songs written by Sara Dallin
Songs written by Siobhan Fahey